John W. "J.W." Salter (February 25, 1852 – November 15, 1927) was an American politician and farmer.

Born near West Bend, Wisconsin, Salter went to University of Wisconsin–Madison. He raised cattle and was in the mercantile business. He help organized the high school in Unity, Wisconsin and was the principal. He was postmaster at Unity, Wisconsin, served on the Marathon County, Wisconsin Board of Supervisors, and served on the board of education. He served in the Wisconsin State Assembly in 1923 and was a Republican. He died of anemia at his home in Unity, Wisconsin.

Notes

1852 births
1927 deaths
People from West Bend, Wisconsin
People from Unity, Wisconsin
University of Wisconsin–Madison alumni
Businesspeople from Wisconsin
Farmers from Wisconsin
County supervisors in Wisconsin
School board members in Wisconsin
Republican Party members of the Wisconsin State Assembly